St. Paul's High School is a private, co-educational school It was established in 1954. It is a missionary educational institution based in Hyderabad, India. It has classes from lower kindergarten to 10th-grade level.

History
In 1954, All Saints High School, Hyderabad celebrated the 100th anniversary of the school's founding. Rev. Bro. John of God, the rector of the school, decided to start a new school.  A building was purchased at King Koti Road, Hyderabad to accommodate the new St. Paul's High School, named after Bro. John of God's favourite saint.

SPHS was lauded as the best school in the twin cities and one of the ten best schools in India according to a survey conducted by Outlook magazine (2001 - 2002 & 2002 - 2003) consecutively. The school has also been ranked consistently among the ten best schools in India. The school was rated as the country's second best school for excellence in computer education by the Government of India and the award was received by Rev. Bro. Franky Noronha from then president Dr. A.P.J. Abdul Kalam in an official ceremony. Alumni include V. V. S. Laxman, Arshad Ayub, Speaker of the Telangana Legislative Assembly, Suresh Reddy, Mithin Aachi, Dr. Mohd. Faheemuddin, Pullela Gopichand Arvind Chenji, former Governor of Andhra Pradesh and Telangana E.S.L. Narasimhan and Nandamuri Balakrishna.

Admissions
Though the school is a Catholic Minority Institution, admission is open to all students regardless of caste, creed, religion or gender. For admission into kindergarten, the school follows a joint admission policy with Little Flower High School, Hyderabad and All Saints High School, Hyderabad, both of which are also run by the Montfort Brothers of St. Gabriel.

Every year in January, one of the three schools conducts the admissions procedure for kindergarten, involving an interview of student and parents. The number of students who apply for admission far exceeds the number of positions available and hence it is a very competitive process. Students are allowed to state their choice among the three schools but their choice is not guaranteed. A twenty-percent quota is generally reserved for economically disadvantaged students.

Divisions
The school has four academic divisions- pre-primary, primary, middle and senior.

The pre-primary division has five sections each of lower and upper Kindergarten. The primary division has five sections each of Classes I to IV (Class IV is equivalent to the Fourth Grade as it is called in the USA, Canada and some other parts of the world. Note that the word "Class" is used instead of "Grade" and the year is written in Roman Numeral). The pre-primary and primary divisions are housed in one campus, commonly called the "Primary School" or "Montfort Preparatory School".

The middle school has five sections each of Classes V to VII and the high school has five sections each of Classes VIII to X. Both the middle school and high school are housed in another building, commonly called the "High School Campus". The high school campus and the primary campus are located on the same road.

Exams
The academic year starts in mid-June and ends in early April and is divided into three quarters. Examinations are held at the end of every quarter and every month.

At the end of Class X, the students take the State Government administered Secondary School Certificate Examination.

Houses 

The school follows a house system. The student body is split into four houses with an aim to promote competition among the students.

The houses are:
 Bro. Montfort House (yellow) - named after St. Louis de Montfort, the Patron Saint of the school
 Bro. Stanislaus House (blue) - named after Bro. Stanislaus who captained the school for 18 years
 Saint Gabriel House (green)- named after St. Gabriel
 John of God House (red) - named after Bro. John of God, the founder of the school

Facilities
Infrastructure
 Library – high school campus
 Library – primary school campus
 Two auditoriums
 Science laboratories
 Computer laboratories
 Auditorium
 Dining hall (girls)
 Digital Library – high school campus
Alphonsa Hall
All classes are equipped with a touch screen-enabled smart board

Sports facilities
 Basketball court
 Table tennis rooms
 Badminton courts (indoor)
 Volleyball

Clubs
Subject clubs
Ecology and Environmental club
HAM or Amateur radio
Interact club for social service
NCC
Dance
Music
Drama
Drawing
Robotics
Scouts and guides
English language

Ceremonies and traditions 

St. Paul's Feast Day
 St. Paul's Feast Day is observed in a solemn ceremony on 29 June every year. The Principal leads a prayer service with a reading from the scriptures and a brief message for the staff remembering the life and message of St. Paul, the patron Saint of the school.

Investiture ceremony
 At the start of each academic year, the newly elected School Cabinet and Class leaders take the oath of office in a colourful Investiture ceremony. All students wear the colours of their houses and cheer as their newly elected leaders march past the dais. The Head Boy and the Head Girl make their maiden speech on this occasion.

Teachers Day
 5 September of every year is celebrated as Teachers' Day all over India in the memory of former President Dr. Sarvepalli Radhakrishnan. In what is probably the most festive celebration of the year, students show their appreciation to their teachers. Sports and games are held for the teachers and prizes are given away. Every classroom has an individual celebration for about an hour before the whole school assembles to celebrate the event. The organization of the event in its entirety is taken up by the School Cabinet and the Class Leaders.

Teacher's Day is also marked as "Back to School Day" by the alumni of the school who make it a point to visit the school and greet their teachers. Retired teachers are also reunited on this occasion.

Independence Day
 Independence Day is celebrated very grandly. There are inter-house cultural competitions and each house is given a topic to perform – usually related to India – and winners are declared. This is the day for the Cabinet to show off their abilities.

Monfort Literary, Cultural and Sports competitions
The Monfort Literary and Cultural Festival (also known as the Mo-Li-Cul Fest) and the Monfort Sports Festivals are held on alternating years. The competitions are held between all the Monfortian schools.

Annual Day
The annual day is a very colourful and enthusiastic event. It is also called the prize night. The parents of the school, head boy, and head girl are invited as the guests of honour. The event starts with the prayer song by the school choir followed by a welcome dance. The head boy and head girl, along with the other school cabinet, present the annual report. Prizes in various fields are given to the students:
Academic Excellence: those at the top of the class
General Proficiency: extraordinary participation in various competitions besides good performance in academics

Young Achievers: students who won various competitions in various fields outside school and brought glory to the school.

Best outgoing student: excellent participation in inter-school competitions
Best Science Student: student of ninth standard who secured highest marks in science among all the sections
Best Student: a gold medal sponsored by Justice Subhashan Reddy is bestowed on two students (a boy and a girl) selected by the school principal.

Principals 

 Bro. John of God - Founder
 Bro. John of the Sacred Heart - 1954-55
 Bro. Martialis - 1956-57
 Bro. Stanislaus - 1958-76
 Bro. Dominic Mary - 1976-78
 Bro. John de Britto - 1978-79
 Bro. N. C. Mathew - 1979-85
 Bro. P. K. Joseph - 1985-89
 Bro. Thomas Reddy - 1989-95
 Bro. Lawrence D’Souza - 1995-2001
 Bro. P. T. Joseph - 2001-03
 Bro. Show Reddy - 2003-2010
 Bro. Sudhakar Reddy - 2010-2016
 Bro. Rayappa Reddy - 2016-2022
 Bro. Sudhakar Reddy - 2022-

The school choir won the carol singing competition held by Little Flower High School continuously for ten years under Sir John W Geiles.

Notable alumni
 K. Srinath Reddy - President, Public Health Foundation of India and former Head of the Department of Cardiology at AIIMS. Recipient of the Queen Elizabeth Medal by the Royal Society for the Promotion of Health.
 Pullela Gopichand- All England Open Badminton Champion for 2001, Rajiv Gandhi Khel Ratna Awardee, Arjuna Award. J. Cornelius Nandyal, India Olympic Badminton Team.
 Ahmed bin Abdullah Balala
George Reddy M.Sc(Physics) Gold medalist, Osmania University.
Mohammad Moazam Khan 
Stephen Raveendra
Rahul Bojja 
AK Khan
Justice Abhishek Reddy
Justice Vijaysen Reddy 
Amjedullah Khan

See also
Education in India
List of schools in India
List of institutions of higher education in Telangana

References

External links 
 Official website

Brothers of Christian Instruction of St Gabriel schools
Catholic secondary schools in India
Christian schools in Telangana
High schools and secondary schools in Hyderabad, India
Educational institutions established in 1954
1954 establishments in India